The Ritz Apartment (also known as The Ritz-Ocala Apartments or The Acker-Ritz Apartments) is a historic building in Ocala, Florida, at 1205 East Silver Springs Boulevard, on the northeast corner of the intersection with Northeast 12th Avenue. On August 21, 1986, it was added to the U.S. National Register of Historic Places.

References

External links
 Marion County listings at National Register of Historic Places
 Marion County listings at Florida's Office of Cultural and Historical Programs

Buildings and structures in Ocala, Florida
Residential buildings on the National Register of Historic Places in Florida
National Register of Historic Places in Marion County, Florida
Apartment buildings in Florida
1925 establishments in Florida